Nelly Alard (born 1960) is a French actress, screenwriter and novelist, graduated from the Conservatoire national supérieur d'art dramatique in Paris in 1985.

Filmography

Actress 
 1983: Life Is a Bed of Roses
 1984: Les Fils des alligators (TV): Hélène
 1986: Marée basse
 1988: L'Enfance de l'art
 1990: Eating ou Le Dernier Secret des femmes: Martine
 1992: Venice/Venice: Jeanne
 1994: Opération cyanure (TV) episode of the series Renseignements généraux
 1995:  (TV) episode of the series : Elsa 
 1996: L'Appartement: Madeleine
 1998: Le choix d'une mère (TV): Catherine
 1999: Intrigues (TV) episode of the series Justice: Martine Mercier
 2001: X-Fragile (TV) episode of the series Commissaire Moulin:  Catherine Vaillant
 2001: Duval: Un mort de trop (TV): Hélène Faucheux
 2002: La Loi du sang (TV) episode of the series : Maude  
 2004: Le Mauvais Fils (TV) episode of the series Julie Lescaut: Émilie Lannée
 2004: Petite môme (TV) episode of the series B.R.I.G.A.D.: Florence Varez
 2004: Sur le fil du rasoir (TV) episode of the series B.R.I.G.A.D.: Florence Varez
 2005: Un ami pour Élodie (TV) episode of the series Élodie Bradford: Florence Larcher 
 2006: Doubles vies (TV) episode of the series :  Marie
 2006: De toute urgence! (TV) episode of the series Joséphine, ange gardien: La mère d'Éric
 2006: Paris 2011: La grande inondation (TV) : Dr Jeanne Barot
 2008: Le Poids du secret (TV) episode of the series : Cécile Delcourt
 2008: Frédéric (TV) episode of the series : Castel Perrin
 2008: Dominique (TV) episode of the series Cellule Identité: Castel Perrin
 2008: Félix (TV) episode of the series Cellule Identité: Castel Perrin
 2009: Ennemis jurés (TV) episode of the series Joséphine, ange gardien: Laure Blondel
 2010:  (série TV): Anne de Tréville 
 2010: Risque majeur (TV) episode of the series : Hélène Dunand

Screenwriter 
 1989: Thank You Satan
 1994: The Psychiatrist (TV) episode of the series Red Shoe Diaries 
 1996: Four on the Floor (TV) episode of the series Red Shoe Diaries

Theatre 
 1983: The Master and Margarita by Mikhail Bulgakov, directed by Andrei Serban, Théâtre de la Ville
 1984: L'Intervention after Victor Hugo, directed by Pierre Vial, 
 1986: Iliad by Homer, directed by Arlette Tephany, Théâtre de l'Union
 1987: On achève bien les chevaux by Horace McCoy, directed by Micheline Kahn, Cirque d'hiver of Paris
 1989: Uncle Vanya by Anton Chekhov directed by Andonis Vouyoucas, Paris
 1992: Arlequin serviteur de deux maîtres by Carlo Goldoni, directed by Jean-Louis Thamin, Bordeaux
 1993: Contre-jour by Jean-Claude Brisville and Jean-Pierre Miquel, Studio des Champs-Elysées, Paris
 1994: La guerre de Troie n'aura pas lieu by Jean Giraudoux, directed by Francis Huster, Festival de Perpignan

Novels 
2010:  — Prix Roger Nimier 2010
2013:  — Prix Interallié 2013

External links 
 Site officiel
 Nelly Alard décroche le prix Interallié pour "Moment d'un couple" on Le Point
 Moment d'un couple de Nelly ALARD on YouTube
 Début de l’aventure américaine pour Nelly Alard, auteur de « Moment d’un couple » on French Morning Los Angeles
 Aurélie Filippetti, Nelly Alard : destins croisés autour de l'adultère on ActuaLitté
 Procès de l'édition: les maîtres de la retouche on L'Express
 

French stage actresses
French film actresses
French women screenwriters
21st-century French novelists
Prix Interallié winners
Roger Nimier Prize winners
French National Academy of Dramatic Arts alumni
1960 births
Living people
21st-century French women writers
21st-century French screenwriters